Trident Blocks，sometimes referred as TR，is a three-wing design. Trident blocks are split into four types, which are Trident 1, Trident 2, Trident 3, and Trident 4. They are mostly built between 1984 and 1992. Most Trident blocks are used as public housing or Home Ownership Scheme estates.

Overview 
The origins of the name suggest that the building is Y-shaped, with three wings. The look of the building and the units look different than one another. The design has low flexibility and the height can't be changed. It takes a lot of land. Therefore, most are located in the new towns of Hong Kong.

Types

Trident 1 
Trident 1 blocks are 35 stories tall and have 36 units per floor. Most units could only accommodate  3 or fewer people.

Trident 1 blocks can be found in Cheung Hong Estate, Shan King Estate, Fu Shin Estate, Lok Wah Estate, Mei Lam Estate and Lei Tung Estate. Lei Tung Estate currently holds the record with the most Trident 1 blocks at 4.

Trident 1 blocks have 12 units per wing. It has 36 units per floor. A typical Trident 1 block has 1,224 units, but some can have up to more than 1,300. This is why units are subdivided.

In Cheung Hong Estate, there is two designs of Trident 1 blocks. Fu Shin Estate currently has a Trident 1 block with an odd number of units per floor, which is 30. Trident 1 blocks are rarely sold.

Trident 2 
A Trident 2 block is 35 stories tall with 816 units and 8 units per wing. There are 24 units per floor. 3/4 of units are classed as Type B, meaning families with 4 or 6 people can live in this type. This is the first time that a concept called 'a house with multiple rooms' is used. 1/4 of the units are Type C units, meaning 7 or more can live there. They are located in the each end of the wing.

Most of them are completed between 1984 and 1989. The first Trident 2 block completed is in Cheung Wah Estate. Other blocks include Pok Hong Estate and Cheung Hong Estate. In fact, in some cases, Trident 2 blocks are also found in Home Ownership Scheme estates, like Ching Shing Court, May Shing Court, and Fung Shing Court. It is only available to Green Form Subsidised Home Ownership Scheme members, an early form of Home Ownership Scheme. The last Trident 2 blocks are in Long Ping Estate. The record holder for the most Trident 2 blocks in an estate is Lei Tung Estate, with 6 blocks.

Trident 3 
Trident 3 blocks are 35 stories tall and have 24 units per floor, with 8 units per wing. It can have 800 to 1100 units. It is also the first design to feature air conditioning and the first to use prefabrication (Tai Wo Estate). It takes up a lot of land. It is mostly found in the new towns of Hong Kong. Most are completed between 1987 and 1992. Heng On Estate currently haves the first Trident 3 blocks. It can be found in Tin Yiu Estate and Tak Tin Estate. There are some cases where Trident 3 blocks end up in Home Ownership Scheme courts. Ching Nga Court and Ching Tai Court are the only HOS courts to have Trident 3 blocks.

Trident 3A 
There are also Trident 3 blocks that have ‘subdivided units’. For example, two of the wings have 5 subdivided units at the end while one of the wings have 4 subdivided units. Therefore, it brings the total up to 32 units per floor with 14 subdivided units. This variant is called ‘Trident 3A’.

Trident 4 
Trident 4 blocks are similar to Trident 3 blocks, but take up less space. Usually, these types of blocks are 35 stories in height. Some are even shorter due to height restrictions by Kai Tak Airport, like Tung Tau Estate, Tsui Wan Estate, Siu Sai Wan Estate, and Lei Cheng Uk Estate. It only has only 414 - 850 units in a Trident 4 block, 6 to 9 units per wing, and 18 to 25 units per floor. The first Trident 4 blocks are in Wah Kwai Estate. The last Trident 4 blocks are completed in Tin Yiu Estate. Lei Cheng Uk Estate and Choi Ha Estate also have Trident 4 blocks. Some Home Ownership scheme courts also have Trident 4 blocks. Fung Chuen Court and Chung Nga Court are the only HOS courts to have Trident 4 blocks.

Gallery

List of blocks 
{|
|- style="font-size: 110%;"
|Hong Kong Isl. and Kowloon ||Eastern New Territories ||Western New Territories
|-
| style="vertical-align: top" |

| style="vertical-align: top" |

| style="vertical-align: top" |

|}

See also 
Types of public housing estate blocks in Hong Kong

References 

Chinese architectural history
Housing in Hong Kong
Public housing in Hong Kong
Hong Kong
People's Republic of China